Roja is a 1992 Indian Tamil-language romantic thriller film written and directed by Mani Ratnam. It stars Arvind Swami and Madhoo, with the latter in the title role. It follows a simple girl from a village in Tamil Nadu, making desperate efforts to find her husband after he is kidnapped by militants during a secret undercover mission in Jammu and Kashmir.

The film was produced by K. Balachander under his Kavithalayaa Productions and distributed by G. Venkateswaran. The film's cinematography was handled by Santhosh Sivan, music by A. R. Rahman in his debut and editing done by Suresh Urs. The film released on 15 August 1992, to positive reviews, receiving praise for its patriotic theme and critically acclaimed soundtrack. It was featured in the Indian panorama section of the 24th IFFI.

Roja won three National Film Awards, including Best Film on National Integration, catapulting Ratnam to national acclaim. The film also gained international acclaim with its nomination for Best Film at the 18th Moscow International Film Festival. The film was re-released for international audiences in light of the growing fear of terrorist attacks across the world. It is the first in Mani Ratnam's Trilogy of films, with the others being Bombay (1995) and Dil Se.. (1998), that depict human relationships against a background of Indian politics.

A. R. Rahman debuted as a film composer with this film. He won the National Film Award for Best Music Direction, Filmfare Award for Best Music Director – Tamil and the Tamil Nadu State Film Award for Best Music Director for his work.

Plot 
In Srinagar, a Kashmiri terrorist, Wasim Khan, is captured by a team led by Colonel Rayappa. In the southern state of Tamil Nadu, 18-year old Roja is a simple village girl born and brought up in Sundarapandiapuram in Tenkasi district. Roja fervently wishes that her sister Shenbagam's marriage proposal with Rishikumar, a cryptologist working with the R.A.W. agency of Indian Intelligence, goes smoothly. Unknown to her and her family, Shenbagam is in love with the son of her maternal uncle.

When Rishi wishes to speak to Shenbagam alone, she gathers enough courage to convey this and politely asks him to reject her in front of her parents, to which he obliges. To everyone's surprise, Rishi requests Roja's hand in marriage instead. Being unaware of Shenbagam's love affair, Roja is not willing to accept Rishi's proposal as she believes that he is the best match for Shenbagam but she marries Rishi, and the couple go to live in Madras while Shenbagam marries her cousin.

Initially, Roja does not like what Rishi did, but when she learns of Shenbagam's love story and consequent rejection of Rishi, she apologises and starts seeing him in a new light. Love blossoms and life is blissful for the couple for a short while. Meanwhile, due to the illness of his Chief, Rishi is assigned to an army communications centre in Baramulla to intercept military intelligence. The couple finds themselves in a beautiful yet alien land. Roja's world turns upside down when Rishi is kidnapped by terrorists whose agenda is to separate Kashmir from India and free their leader, Wasim Khan, from judicial custody.

Faced with the daunting task of rescuing her husband, Roja runs from pillar to post, pleading with politicians and the military for help. Further complicating matters is the language barrier: She can't speak their language, and they can't speak hers. Meanwhile, Rishi, held captive by a group of terrorists led by Liaqat, an associate to Wasim Khan, tries to reason with the terrorists, about their misdirected motive for the liberation of Kashmir. Liaqat's sister shows a little compassion towards him. Initially, when Roja's efforts fail, the Indian government denies any negotiations with the terrorists for the release of Rishi in the media.

The angered terrorists attempt to burn an Indian flag. Rishi risks his life to put out the fire and shows the terrorist how much the country means to him, a regular citizen. When Liaqat's younger brother, who with a few other youths from his village was sent across the border to Pakistan for training, is shot by the Pakistan Army, Liaqat's strong belief is shaken, but he still manages to convince himself of the cause. Consequently, Roja's efforts to apprise the politicians of her suffering and pain are successful as a minister pities her and offers to help.

Much to the chagrin of Rayappa, the government decides to release Wasim Khan in exchange for Rishi. Rishi, not wanting to be used as a pawn to release a dangerous terrorist, gets help from the sympathetic Liaqat's sister and escapes — with Liaqat and his men chasing him. Rayappa, Roja, and other army officers get to the hostage exchange spot with Wasim Khan, but Liaqat does not show up.  The Army locks Wasim Khan up in the prison.

Rishi has managed to get close to the exchange spot on his own after evading the terrorists. During his escape, Rishi subdues two terrorists. Liaqat catches up with him and holds him at gunpoint. Rishi reasons with Liaqat further and convinces him that his war is immoral. Liaqat lets Rishi go and he goes to the exchange spot. Liaqat escapes from the Indian Army while Rishi and Roja are united once again.

Cast 

Arvind Swami as Rishi Kumar
Madhoo as Roja 
Nassar as Colonel Rayappa
Janagaraj as Achu Maharaj
Pankaj Kapur as Liaqat
Shiva Rindani as Wasim Khan
Vaishnavi Aravind as Shenbagam
C. K. Saraswathi as one of the village seniors
Vijaya Chandrika as Roja's mother
Sathyapriya as Rishi's mother
Vatsala Rajagopal as Roja's paternal grandmother
Sujitha as Chinna Ponnu
S. V. Venkatraman as Chandramoorthy, Rishikumar's chief and RAW official
Nirmala Periyasamy as Newsreader
Raju Sundaram (special appearance in the song "Rukmini")

Production

Development 
On 28 June 1991, K. Doraiswamy, an executive of the Indian Oil Corporation, was kidnapped by Kashmiri militants and put in captivity for two months. This inspired Mani Ratnam to make the film Roja. Doraiswamy's wife was fighting for his release, and according to Ratnam, it was her plight that the film was based on.

During the making of Anjali (1990), Ratnam told actor and director Kitty the outline of Roja and offered him to direct the film. Kitty declined, as he wanted to do something of his own. As Ratnam was telling him the outline, the subject became more crystallised. Kitty did not pick it up and when filmmaker K. Balachander asked Ratnam, he told him the outline. All the developments happened after that. It was Balachander who approached Ratnam to make a film for his banner. As Balachander was the inspiration and the reason for Ratnam entering Tamil films, when he asked him to make a film for his banner, Ratnam wanted it to be one of the best films they had produced. Ratnam was keen that it needed to be of Balachander's standard. Balachander instantly approved the outline of the film when Ratnam narrated. However, he disliked the title Roja (Rose) as he felt it sounded similar to the name of a brand of crushed betel nut. Ratnam thought the title represented Kashmir because "the rose is something beautiful but with thorns". To satisfy Balachander, he suggested another title Irudhi Varai (Till the end), but Balachander preferred Roja, which was finalised.

Roja was the first film for which Ratnam used a Steadicam, in the shot that introduces the terrorists' hideout to the audiences. The film was made on a shoestring budget. The technicians worked for less money with the understanding that the film would also be sold for less money. It was not thought of as something that would work on a big scale. The film was composed mostly of newcomers, a new music director, and it was about Kashmir which, according to Ratnam, not much was known to Tamil people at that time. He called the film "a bit of an experiment". It is also the first in Ratnam's trilogy of films that depict human relationships against a background of Indian politics, including Bombay (1995) and Dil Se.. (1998). Roja is a contemporary adaptation of the story of Savitri and Satyavan. According to Ratnam, it was not originally planned as a political film: "It was a phase India was going through and these things affected me and found their way into my work."

Casting 
Arvind Swami was signed on to play the lead role in Roja after Rajiv Menon declined. Aishwarya and Ayesha Jhulka were initial choices for the female lead, but declined due to date issues; the role went to Madhoo, credited as Madhubala. Aishwarya later revealed that she deeply regretted her decision, which was made by her grandmother against her will, for a Telugu film which was later cancelled. Ratnam wanted a North Indian actor to portray Liaqat, a Kashmiri character, and Pankaj Kapur accepted when approached. Ratnam approached Karisma Kapoor to play a Kashmiri girl, but ultimately decided not to cast her, believing she was "far too expensive for a Tamil film"; the role went to another actress.

Filming 
Ratnam had planned to shoot Roja in Kashmir, but extreme terrorism there forced him to shoot the film in other hill stations resembling it. Shooting locations included Coonoor, Ooty, and Manali, Himachal Pradesh. The film's cinematographer Santosh Sivan said that a lot of images were written in at the script level. Even in the Kashmir sequences, the audience only sees the snow when Roja sees it for the first time. These things were written into the script. The song "Chinna Chinna Aasai" was shot at Hogenakkal Falls in Dharmapuri and in the Banatheertham falls in Papanasam R.F., Tamil Nadu. Shakti Singh dubbed for Arvind Swami in the Hindi version of the film, while Madhubala dubbed for herself. The whole film was completed in less than 60 days.

Themes and influences 
Writing for the magazine Jump Cut, Kumudan Maderya noted that Roja celebrates "the middle-class yuppie hero’s nationalistic fervor" and positions the "anti-national communalist terrorists in Kashmir" as key threats to India as a whole. Vairamuthu, who was signed as the lyricist, felt the film's "tense and action-packed" content was in sharp contrast to the "poetic" title. Journalist Malini Mannath and a writer for Bangalore Mirror compared Roja to Held Hostage (1991), a television film about the kidnapping of journalist Jerry Levin whose rescue was organised by his wife.

Soundtrack 

The soundtrack and background score for the film was composed by A. R. Rahman in his debut as a music director. Mani Ratnam, who previously worked with Ilayaraaja in his earlier films, replaced him with Rahman, who worked as a keyboard programmer for Ilayaraaja for his film Moodu Pani (1980), also marking their first collaboration as well. The album features seven tracks in Tamil and Hindi, and six tracks in Telugu, Malayalam Marathi and five tracks in the instrumental adaptation album.

The song "Thamizha Thamizha" is a poem written by Subramanya Bharathi. "Chinna Chinna Aasai" was the first song Rahman had composed for the film. The song "Kadhal Rojave" has two versions in both Tamil and Hindi; a solo and a duet in the former. The Hindi version of the song, titled "Roja Jaaneman", has two versions – one by S. P. Balasubrahmanyam and the other by Hariharan.

The album received critical acclaim and was also listed in Time magazine's "10 Best Soundtracks" of all time. The Tamil and Hindi versions of the album sold over million units in India, with the Tamil version selling over 200,000 units and the Hindi version selling 2.8million units.

Release 
Roja was released on 15 August 1992, and distributed by GV Films. In August 2015, it was screened at the 2015 London Indian Film Festival, in the retrospective series Politics as Spectacle: The Films of Mani Ratnam, along with Bombay and Dil Se. Owing to the film’s success, the film was dubbed and released in Hindi, Telugu, Marathi and Malayalam languages.

Reception

Critical response 
Roja received positive reception for its patriotic themes. On 26 September 1992, K. Vijayan of New Straits Times wrote, "Under Mani Ratnam's direction, Arvind and Madhoo gave their best ... The excellent photography by Santhosh Sivan [who was also the cameraman for Thalapathi] makes us appreciate the beauty we take for granted in the villages. The snow-capped mountains and flower-covered valleys of Kashmir are also an eyeful." Writing for The Indian Express, Malini Mannath compared Roja unfavourably to Held Hostage; she praised Arvind Swami's performance, calling him "dignified and natural", but criticised Madhubala's performance in the scenes where Roja pleads for her husband's rescue, saying, "Her tremulous whisper praying for help, sounds contrived". She also felt that Pankaj Kapoor looked "lost in his role", but lauded the cinematography by Santosh Sivan and the editing by Suresh Urs. T. N. Seshan, then the Chief Election Commissioner of India declared, "This is a film that every Tamilians should see." S. R. of Kalki wrote "Amazing cinematography, superb direction, heart touching songs, lilting music (debutant Rahman), humorous and strong dialogues, natural acting + good story".

Box office 
Roja emerged a commercial success in the Tamil market. The Hindi dubbed version of the film was also an equal success.

Awards 
1993 National Film Awards (India)

 Won – Silver Lotus Award – Best Music Director – A. R. Rahman
 Won – Silver Lotus Award – Best Lyricist – Vairamuthu
 Won – Nargis Dutt Award for Best Feature Film on National Integration
Madhoo's performance took her close to winning in the category of Best Actress, but she eventually lost to Dimple Kapadia.

1993 Filmfare Awards South
 Won – Filmfare Best Movie Award (Tamil) – Roja
 Won – Filmfare Best Music Director Award (Tamil) – A. R. Rahman

1993 Tamil Nadu State Film Awards (India)
 Won – Tamil Nadu State Film Award for Best Film
 Won – Tamil Nadu State Film Award for Best Director – Mani Ratnam
 Won – Tamil Nadu State Film Award for Best Music Director – A. R. Rahman
 Won – Tamil Nadu State Film Award Special Prize – Madhoo
 Won – Tamil Nadu State Film Award for Best Female Playback Singer – Minmini

1993 Shantaram Awards
 Won – Best Director – Mani Ratnam

1993 Moscow International Film Festival (Russia)
 Nominated – Golden St. George (Best Film) – Mani Ratnam

Bite the Mango Film Festival (United Kingdom)
 Featured screening and premiere – Roja

Wangfujing Film Festival (Beijing)
 Special screening – Roja

Indian Film Week (Moscow)
 Screening in the category of "From the classics to the contemporary" – Roja

References

Further reading

External links 
 

1990s political drama films
1990s political thriller films
1990s romantic thriller films
1990s Tamil-language films
1990s thriller drama films
1992 films
Best Film on National Integration National Film Award winners
Films about Savitri and Satyavan
Films about terrorism in India
Films about the Research and Analysis Wing
Films directed by Mani Ratnam
Films scored by A. R. Rahman
Films set in Jammu and Kashmir
Films shot in Himachal Pradesh
Films shot in Manali, Himachal Pradesh
Films shot in Ooty
Films shot in Tirunelveli
Indian Army in films
Indian political thriller films
Indian romantic thriller films
Indian thriller drama films
Kashmir conflict in films
Politics of Jammu and Kashmir
1992 drama films